Mashiat Tasnim Rahman is a Bangladeshi model, television personality, and actress. She is widely known for her participation in the 2010 edition of Lux Channel i Superstar.

Early life 

Mashiat was born on 24 August in Rangpur. She grew up there in a small family comprising her parents and a brother. She passed her Secondary School Certificate exams from Cantonment Public School and College, Rangpur and enrolled in the BBA program at North South University in Dhaka. In 2013, she was admitted to the Media Studies and Journalism Department of the University of Liberal Arts Bangladesh (ULAB). According to her, she has "always been a good student."

Career 

Mashiat came into the spotlight by finishing in fourth place in the talent hunt Lux Channel i Superstar 2010. Her debut as a TV actor was opposite Chanchal Chowdhury in Salauddin Lavlu's Tritiyo Purush. Since then she has appeared on TV in more than two dozen serials and single episode plays.

Mashiat has emceed TV programmes, including Pepsi Change the Game and Style and Fashion.

She has done television commercials for Confidence Soybean oil, Pran Lychee Candy, Pran Sunny Orange Juice, and Airtel Ajibon Meyad.

Television

Awards

References

Living people
21st-century Bangladeshi actresses
Bangladeshi female models
People from Rangpur District
Bengali television actresses
Bangladeshi television actresses
Year of birth missing (living people)